HMS Loring (K565) was a British Captain-class frigate of the Royal Navy in commission during World War II. Originally constructed as the United States Navy Evarts-class destroyer escort DE-520, she served in the Royal Navy from 1943 to 1945.

Construction and transfer
The ship was laid down by the Boston Navy Yard in Boston, Massachusetts, on 18 July 1943 as the unnamed U.S. Navy destroyer escort DE-520 and launched on 30 August 1943. The United States transferred the ship to the United Kingdom under Lend-Lease upon completion sometime in November 1943; sources vary on the exact date.

Service history
The ship was commissioned into service in the Royal Navy as HMS Loring (K565) in November 1943 simultaneously with her transfer. She served on patrol and escort duty in the eastern North Atlantic Ocean for the remainder of World War II.

The Royal Navy decommissioned Loring in 1945 after the conclusion of the war and returned her to the U.S. Navy while the ship was still in the United Kingdom on 7 January 1947.

Disposal
The United States sold Loring on 25 March 1947 to a Greek shipbreaking firm for scrapping.

References

Navsource Online: Destroyer Escort Photo Archive HMS Loring (DE-520/K-565)
uboat.net HMS Loring (K 565)
Captain Class Frigate Association HMS Loring K565 (DE 520)

External links
 Photo gallery of HMS Loring (K565)

 

Captain-class frigates
Evarts-class destroyer escorts
World War II frigates of the United Kingdom
World War II frigates and destroyer escorts of the United States
Ships built in Boston
1943 ships